Gnomidolon is a genus of beetles in the family Cerambycidae, containing the following species:

 Gnomidolon amaurum Martins, 1967
 Gnomidolon analogum Martins, 1967
 Gnomidolon basicoeruleum Martins, 1962
 Gnomidolon bellulum Martins, 2006
 Gnomidolon bellum Martins & Galileo, 2002
 Gnomidolon biarcuatum (White, 1855)
 Gnomidolon bipartitum Gounelle, 1909
 Gnomidolon bonsae Martins, 1967
 Gnomidolon bordoni Joly, 1991
 Gnomidolon brethesi Bruch, 1908
 Gnomidolon cingillum Martins, 1967
 Gnomidolon colasi Martins, 1967
 Gnomidolon conjugatum (White, 1855)
 Gnomidolon cruciferum (Gounelle, 1909)
 Gnomidolon denticorne Bates, 1892
 Gnomidolon elegantulum Lameere, 1885
 Gnomidolon fraternum Martins, 1971
 Gnomidolon friedi Clarke, 2007
 Gnomidolon fuchsi Martins, 1971
 Gnomidolon gemuseusi Clarke, 2007
 Gnomidolon glabratum Martins, 1962
 Gnomidolon gounellei Martins, 1967
 Gnomidolon gracile (Gounelle, 1909)
 Gnomidolon grantsaui Martins, 1967
 Gnomidolon guianense (White, 1855)
 Gnomidolon hamatum Linsley, 1935
 Gnomidolon humerale Bates, 1870
 Gnomidolon ignicolor Napp & Martins, 1985
 Gnomidolon incisum Napp & Martins, 1985
 Gnomidolon insigne Martins, 1967
 Gnomidolon insulicola Bates, 1885
 Gnomidolon laetabile Bates, 1885
 Gnomidolon lansbergei (Thomson, 1867)
 Gnomidolon longipenne Martins, 1967
 Gnomidolon maculicorne Gounelle, 1909
 Gnomidolon melanosomum Bates, 1870
 Gnomidolon meridanum Napp & Martins, 1985
 Gnomidolon musivum (Erichson, 1847)
 Gnomidolon nanum Martins, 1962
 Gnomidolon nigritum Martins, 1967
 Gnomidolon nympha Thomson, 1865
 Gnomidolon oeax Thomson, 1867
 Gnomidolon opacicolle Napp & Martins, 1985
 Gnomidolon ornaticolle Martins, 1960
 Gnomidolon pallidicauda Gounelle, 1909
 Gnomidolon parallelum Clarke, 2007
 Gnomidolon peruvianum Martins, 1960
 Gnomidolon picipes Bates, 1870
 Gnomidolon picticorne Martins, 1971
 Gnomidolon pictum (Audinet-Serville, 1834)
 Gnomidolon pilosum Martins, 1962
 Gnomidolon primarium Martins, 1967
 Gnomidolon proseni Martins, 1962
 Gnomidolon proximum Martins, 1960
 Gnomidolon pubicolle Joly, 1990
 Gnomidolon pulchrum Martins, 1960
 Gnomidolon rubricolor Bates, 1870
 Gnomidolon simplex (White, 1855)
 Gnomidolon sinopium Martins, 2006
 Gnomidolon subfasciatum Martins, 1967
 Gnomidolon suturale (White, 1855)
 Gnomidolon sylvarum (Bates, 1892)
 Gnomidolon tomentosum Martins, 1971
 Gnomidolon ubirajarai Joly, 1990
 Gnomidolon varians Gounelle, 1909
 Gnomidolon wappesi Martins, 2006

References

 
Ibidionini